Archie Mason Griffin (born August 21, 1954) is a former American football running back. He played seven seasons in the National Football League (NFL) with the Cincinnati Bengals. As college football's only two-time Heisman Trophy winner, he is considered one of the greatest college football players of all time. Griffin won four Big Ten Conference titles with the Ohio State Buckeyes and was the first player ever to start in four Rose Bowls.

High school career
Griffin rushed for 1,787 yards and scored over 170 points in 11 games, including 29 touchdowns, as a senior fullback at Eastmoor High School (now Eastmoor Academy) in Columbus, Ohio. That year, he led Eastmoor to the Columbus City League championship, rushing for 267 yards on 31 carries in the title game against Linden-McKinley High School. In his junior year, Griffin also rushed for over 1,000 yards.

In 1996, Griffin was inducted into the High School Hall of Fame. Eastmoor Academy renamed their playing field "Archie Griffin Field" in his honor.

College career
Griffin played for the Ohio State University Buckeyes from 1972-75. When he won a starting position his freshman year, many sophomores were disappointed because Griffin took their spot. Former Ohio State head coach Woody Hayes said of Griffin, "He's a better young man than he is a football player, and he's the best football player I've ever seen."

In 1972, Griffin was a T-formation halfback, and from 1973 through 1975, he was the team's I-formation tailback. He led the Buckeyes in rushing as a freshman with 867 yards, but his numbers exploded the following year with the team's conversion to the I-formation. He rushed for 1,428 yards in the regular season as a sophomore, 1,620 as a junior, 1,357 as a senior. Griffin was the only back to lead the Big Ten Conference in rushing for three straight years until Jonathan Taylor did so from 2017-2019. Overall, Griffin rushed for 5,589 yards on 924 carries in his four seasons with the Buckeyes (1972–1975), then an NCAA record. He had 6,559 all-purpose yards and scored 26 touchdowns. In their four seasons with Griffin as their starting running back, the Buckeyes posted a record of 40-5-1. Griffin is one of only two players in collegiate football history to start four Rose Bowl games, the other being Brian Cushing.

Griffin introduced himself to OSU fans as a freshman by setting a school single-game rushing record of 239 yards in the second game of the 1972 season, against North Carolina, breaking a team record that had stood for 27 seasons. His only carry in his first game had resulted in a fumble. He broke his own record as a sophomore with 246 rushing yards in a game against the Iowa Hawkeyes. Over his four-year collegiate career, Griffin rushed for at least 100 yards in 34 games, including an NCAA record 31 consecutive games.

Career rushing statistics

Honors
Griffin finished fifth in the Heisman vote in his sophomore year and won the award as a junior and senior.  He is the only NCAA football player to date to win the award twice. In addition to his two Heisman Trophies, Griffin won many other college awards. He is one of four players to win the Chicago Tribune Silver Football, the Big 10's Most Valuable Player Award, twice (1973–1974). United Press International named him Player of the Year twice (1974–1975), the Walter Camp Foundation named him top player twice (1974–1975), he won the Maxwell Award (1975), and Sporting News named him Man of the Year (1975).

The College Football Hall of Fame enshrined Griffin in 1986. Ohio State enshrined him in their own Varsity O Hall of Fame in 1981 and officially retired his number, 45, in 1999. He was inducted into the Rose Bowl Hall of Fame in 1990. In 2007, he was ranked No. 21 on ESPN's Top 25 Players In College Football History list. On January 1, 2014, Griffin was named the All-Century Player of the Rose Bowl Game during the celebration of the 100th Rose Bowl Game and participated in the Rose Parade.

Professional football career

In the 1976 NFL Draft, he was the first-round draft choice of the Cincinnati Bengals, selected as the 24th overall pick in the draft. Griffin played 7 seasons in the NFL, all with the Bengals (1976–1982). He was joined in the backfield by his college fullback teammate Pete Johnson, who was drafted by the Bengals in 1977, and his brother, Ohio State defensive back Ray Griffin, who was drafted by the team in 1978. During his 7 NFL seasons, he rushed for 2808 yards and 7 touchdowns, and caught 192 passes for 1607 yards and 6 touchdowns. Griffin played in Super Bowl XVI with the Bengals after the 1981 season.

After his career with the Bengals ended, Griffin played briefly with the Jacksonville Bulls of the United States Football League.

Career after football

Griffin is the former President and CEO of the Ohio State University Alumni Association. He is also the current spokesman for the Wendy's High School Heisman award program. Formerly, he served as Assistant Athletic Director for The Ohio State University and still speaks to the football team before every game.

Griffin also serves on the Board of Directors for Motorists Insurance which has offices in downtown Columbus, Abercrombie and Fitch, and the National Football Foundation and College Hall of Fame, based in Irving, Texas.

Along with former NBA basketball star Magic Johnson, Griffin was one of the investors in Mandalay Baseball Properties LLC which owned the Dayton Dragons, a class single-A minor league baseball team affiliated with Major League Baseball's Cincinnati Reds, prior to the sale of the team in 2014 to Palisades Arcadia Baseball LLC.

Family
Griffin is a son of Margaret and James Griffin. He has six brothers and a sister. His brothers are named Jimmy, Larry, Daryle, Duncan, Raymond (former NFL cornerback who for a time was a teammate with the Bengals), and Keith who also played in the NFL. His sister is named Krystal.

As of 2020, Griffin's son Andre is entering his first year as an assistant coach at Ohio Northern University and previously was the Head Coach at Lima Senior High School. Griffin's son Adam played as a defensive back for the Ohio State football team for three seasons until a shoulder injury ended his football career.
Griffin also has three grandsons: Kamron, Diante, and Adrien.

See also
 List of NCAA major college football yearly rushing leaders

References

External links
 
 
 
 

1954 births
Living people
All-American college football players
American football running backs
Cincinnati Bengals players
College Football Hall of Fame inductees
Heisman Trophy winners
Jacksonville Bulls players
Maxwell Award winners
Ohio State Buckeyes football players
Players of American football from Columbus, Ohio